Luísa Macuto Tomás (born 24 March 1983) is an Angolan basketball player. At the 2012 Summer Olympics, she competed for the Angola women's national basketball team in the women's event.

References

External links
 

1983 births
Living people
Angolan women's basketball players
C.D. Primeiro de Agosto women's basketball players
G.D. Interclube women's basketball players
Olympic basketball players of Angola
Basketball players at the 2012 Summer Olympics
People from Benguela
Centers (basketball)
African Games silver medalists for Angola
African Games medalists in basketball
Competitors at the 2007 All-Africa Games